Phalonidia scabra is a species of moth of the family Tortricidae. It is found in China (Gansu, Guizhou, Heilongjiang, Jiangxi, Liaoning, Shanxi, Yunnan, Zhejiang) and Korea.

The wingspan is 12−14 mm.

References

Moths described in 1991
Phalonidia